The Two Princes is a scripted fantasy action adventure podcast from Gimlet Media. It was created and written by Kevin Christopher Snipes and directed by Mimi O'Donnell. The story focuses on two princes from warring kingdoms who become unwitting allies when they journey into a mysterious forest in order to try and save their realms. Along the way, the two heroes fall in love with each other.

Cast
The official cast was revealed on May 23, 2019.
Noah Galvin as Prince Rupert of the West
Ari'el Stachel as Prince Amir of the East
Christine Baranski as Queen Lavinia of the West
Shohreh Aghdashloo as Queen Atossa of the East
Samira Wiley as Joan 
Alfredo Narciso as Barabbas and The Lord Chamberlain
Mandi Masden as Lady Cecily and Crazy Tooth
Richard Kind as Cedric Strangelove
Matthew Rhys as Sir Percy
Omar Metwally as The King of the East
Sean Pertwee as The King of West
Laura Benanti  as Flora
Daphne Rubin-Vega as Arachne
C. J. Wilson as Brutus
Cynthia Erivo as Queen Malkia of the Midlands 
Tonya Pinkins as Upendo
Gideon Glick as Percy Junior
Ali Stroker as Lorelei
Michael Braun as The Hydra
Kathryn Kates as The Barkeep
Jonah Fields as Wenceslaus
Wesley Taylor as Prince Darling of the North

Episodes 
All episodes of season one were released on June 4, 2019 and all episodes of season two were released in December 11, 2019. The third season was released on October 20, 2020.

Reception
The Guardian named The Two Princes as the Week's Best Home Entertainment for June 2019. It later named the show one of the Six Best Serialized Podcasts of 2019.

Podcast reviewer Wil Williams wrote positively about The Two Princes, stating that while it "isn't perfect, it is fun, sweet and incredibly enjoyable", citing the "high genre, borderline camp setup" and "fantastical plot" alongside a "contemporary sense of humor" as reasons why she believes the podcast works so well. Williams praised the "star-studded" cast, explain that she found herself "laughing out loud throughout the entire first season" and adding that there is "a feeling of joy that comes through in each performance" and that "every actor not only commits, no matter how silly the role, but commits so gleefully, it's infectious and is one of the key reasons The Two Princes is so genuinely charming". The romance between the two leads was also praised with the reviewer noting that "the tropes here don’t make the romance feel cheesy or contrived, especially in the familiar trappings of the fairytale. Instead, they feel familiar enough to sink into, a sort of predictability that feels comforting versus boring. The Two Princes isn’t trying to reinvent the wheel. It’s trying to let a marginalized group actually take that wheel for once". Although critical of the sound design which felt "inorganic and impersonal", Williams concluded that the podcast is "sweet and fun in a way LGBTQ+ audiences don’t often get to hear" and admitted that she "powered through the first season in a day and immediately wanted more".

The Nerd Daily provided 7 reasons to listen to The Two Princes: "A truly epic LGBTQ+ romance that ends happily, a dragon named Porridge, strong female characters, complex parent/child relationship that's handled exceptionally well, the sound effects really stand out, the narrative never gets overwhelming, and all the members of the star-studded cast deliver delightful performances!"

Adaptation
In February 2020, Deadline reported that Spotify was in talks with HBO Max to adapt The Two Princes into an hour-long animated TV special, though several other parties were also interested in developing the special. Original writer Kevin Snipes is set to work on the adaptation but it has not yet been announced whether the voice cast will reprise their roles. Warner Bros. Animation will animate the special, which will be produced by Chris Giliberti and Justin McGoldrick from Gimlet Media.

See also 

 Fantasy podcast
 List of LGBT characters in radio and podcasts

References

External links
 

Audio podcasts
LGBT-related podcasts
2019 podcast debuts
Warner Bros. Animation animated films
Fantasy podcasts
Gimlet Media
Children's podcasts
Scripted podcasts